Antonino Trio (born 4 June 1993) is an Italian long jumper, that in addition to having won an absolute Italian title at a senior level,  he finished twice in the top 60  in the IAAF world leading list, in 2018 at 37th place with 7.88 m and in 2019 at 35th with 7.87 m.

Biography
Despite being both long jumpers and also carrying the same surname, he is not a relative of the former Italian champion Maria Vittoria Trio.

Personal bests
Long jump: 7.96 m (+0.5) ( Palermo, 25 July 2020)
Long jump indoor: 7.94 m ( Ancona, 17 February 2018)
Triple jump: 15.98 m (+1.2) ( Palermo, 10 May 2014)

National titles
Italian Athletics Indoor Championships
Long jump: 2018, 2021

References

External links
 

1993 births
Athletics competitors of Fiamme Gialle
Italian male long jumpers
Italian male triple jumpers
Living people
Sportspeople from the Province of Messina
Italian Athletics Championships winners